The following is a list of horror podcasts, which vary in style of delivery.

List

See also 

 Horror podcast

References

External links 
  on Podchaser
  on Castbox.fm
  at FictionPodcasts.com

Horror